Tehran Stock Exchange Services Company (TSESC) (Shirkat-e Xedâmat-e Burs-e Tehran) is a subsidiary of the Tehran Stock Exchange (TSE).  TSESC was established in June 1994 in Tehran as an independent company owned by TSE and its members.  The TSESC’s main function is to develop, maintain, operate, and promote systems for all stages of the trade-cycle services in Iran in order to attain highest level of efficiency and meet international standards. Specifically, TSESC is responsible to:

 Provide clearance, settlement, and information services for all securities traded in Tehran Stock Exchange (TSE) and other organized markets
 Provide custody and asset services as the Central Securities Depository of Iran
 Maintain all hardware and software used for trade and post trade activities of TSE and other organized markets in Iran
 Develop and enhance existing software applications to address ever changing TSE requirements
 Provide consultancy and technical advice to all stock exchanges or interested organizations for trade and post-trade activities
 Function as the National Numbering Agency of Iran

TSESC has operating facilities in multiple locations throughout Iran.

History 
TSESC started its operation as a subsidiary of the National Informatics Corporation (NIC) of Iran in July 1984.  Originally, TSESC developed, maintained and operated the computerized system of TSE used for trade and post-trade activities.  In June 1994, TSESC was incorporated as an independent company under the ownership of the TSE, its members, and NIC. Currently, TSE and its members are the sole owners of TSESC.  Additional services have been added to the list of its services since its incorporation as an independent company.

Structure 
TSE and its member brokerage companies own TSESC.  TSE is the majority shareholder and few brokerage companies own a small percentage of shares at TSESC.

TSESC is administrated by a Board consisting of five Directors: representatives of the TSE and member brokerage companies.

Managing Director of TSESC attends board meetings.

External links
Tehran Stock Exchange (TSE)
Iran CSD Company

Financial services companies of Iran